Pliny Wilson Williamson (September 24, 1876 – October 21, 1958) was an American lawyer and politician from New York.

Life
He was born on September 24, 1876, in Russellville, Brown County, Ohio, the son of Albert M. Williamson MD (born 1844) and Emma (Salisbury) Williamson (1852–1912). He graduated from Steele High School in Dayton, Ohio; from Oberlin College; and from Columbia Law School in 1903. He practiced law in New York City. In 1904, he married Jane Louise Humes (died 1941), and they had two children (Jane Williamson Hacket & Andrew Wilson Williamson II).

Among his clients were the Wright brothers and the Wright Company.

He was Supervisor of the Town of Scarsdale from 1929 to 1934; and was Majority Leader of the Board of Supervisors of Westchester County until 1931.

Williamson was a member of the New York State Senate from 1935 until his death in 1958, sitting in the 158th, 159th, 160th, 161st, 162nd, 163rd, 164th, 165th, 166th, 167th, 168th, 169th, 170th and 171st New York State Legislatures.

He died on October 21, 1958, at his home in Scarsdale, New York.

Sources

1876 births
1958 deaths
Republican Party New York (state) state senators
People from Brown County, Ohio
People from Scarsdale, New York
Town supervisors in New York (state)
Oberlin College alumni
Columbia Law School alumni